Garosu-gil  (Hangeul: 가로수길) is an area in Sinsa-dong, Gangnam, Seoul, South Korea. The name Garosu-gil, meaning "tree-lined street", refers to the ginkgo trees planted along the streets in the area. Garosu-gil is known for upscale boutiques, galleries, restaurants, and cafes, among others.

Garosu-gil, along with 'Cheongdam's Fashion Street' in Cheongdam-dong and Apgujeong Rodeo Street in Apgujeong-dong, connected by the main Apgujeong-ro, are together seen as the main fashionable and trendsetting areas in Seoul.

History
In the 1980s, art galleries started to move into the area, after which a variety of cultural facilities have formed. These have provided the foundation of Garosu-gil. Later in the 1990s, the area began to attract young artists and fashion designers, the latter of which would launch their own brands, transforming Garosu-gil into the "Designer Street." Many small shops and restaurants, as well as a wide range of popular clothing stores, have since moved into the neighborhood.  Based on this history, Garosu-gil presents a fascinating dichotomy of the old and new.

Attractions 
 The first Apple Store in South Korea

Transportation
 Sinsa station (Line 3)
 Apgujeong station (Line 3)

References

Neighbourhoods in Gangnam District
Shopping districts and streets in South Korea
Tourist attractions in Seoul